Beatriz Elena Paredes Rangel (born 18 August 1953) is a Mexican politician who served as president of the Institutional Revolutionary Party (PRI). She was the first woman to serve as Governor of Tlaxcala and the second woman to serve as a state governor in Mexican history.

Paredes Rangel studied Sociology at the National Autonomous University of Mexico (UNAM) graduated in sociology with honoring mention in 2016 She began her political career at the age of 21 as a Tlaxcala state deputy (1974–77) and then served as advisor for the Governor of Tlaxcala (1978–80). In 1982 she was appointed Undersecretary for Agrarian Reform and from 1987 to 1992 she served as Governor of Tlaxcala. She has also served in the Chamber of Deputies, in the Senate and President Carlos Salinas appointed her Ambassador to Cuba in 1993. She was the President of the Chamber of Deputies in 2001–2002.

In the 2006 Federal District election she ran for Head of Government (mayor) of Mexico City, representing an alliance of the PRI and the PVEM; she lost the election against Marcelo Ebrard.

Paredes has occupied different positions in the PRI, mostly representing the rural and indigenous wings of the party. She served as general secretary of the PRI and ran for the presidency of her party but lost to Roberto Madrazo. In 2007, she ran again for the party's presidency and won by a large margin. Paredes has also expressed her support for the recognition of same-sex unions in Mexico in 2010 after Mexico City legalized same sex marriage.

On 5 October 2009 she publicly acknowledged her interest in running for President of Mexico in 2012 and her pro-choice stand on abortion issues. She was previously the ambassador of Mexico in Brazil. She is also a member of Washington D.C. based think tank the Inter-American Dialogue.

References

1953 births
Living people
20th-century Mexican politicians
20th-century Mexican women politicians
21st-century Mexican politicians
21st-century Mexican women politicians
Ambassadors of Mexico to Brazil
Ambassadors of Mexico to Cuba
Governors of Tlaxcala
Institutional Revolutionary Party politicians
Members of the Inter-American Dialogue
Members of the Chamber of Deputies (Mexico)
Members of the Congress of Tlaxcala
Members of the Senate of the Republic (Mexico)
Mexican abortion-rights activists
Mexican women ambassadors
National Autonomous University of Mexico alumni
Presidents of the Chamber of Deputies (Mexico)
Presidents of the Institutional Revolutionary Party
Politicians from Tlaxcala
University of Barcelona alumni
Women governors of States of Mexico
Women members of the Chamber of Deputies (Mexico)
Women members of the Senate of the Republic (Mexico)
Women legislative speakers